Sonia Brucke Romero is a Paraguayan civil servant. Since 2006 she has served the Senate of Paraguay as Director of the Commission for Equality, Gender and Social Development.

Brucke was Planning Director at the Women's Secretariat (Secretaría de la Mujer de la Presidencia de la República, SMPR). She helped create Paraguay's Ministry for Women.

Works
 (with Allison Petrozziello, Jessica Menon and Marcia Greenberg) USAID/Paraguay Gender Assessment, USAID, 2011

References

External links
 Sonia Brucke, La mujer y la equidad de género en cifras en Paraguay: Avances y Desafíos

Year of birth missing (living people)
Living people
Paraguayan women's rights activists
Paraguayan civil servants